The 54th New Zealand Parliament will be elected at the 2023 general election, with election day set to 14 October. On 8 September 2023, the current 53rd New Zealand Parliament will be dissolved and on 10 September 2023, Writ day will occur. 

The 54th Parliament will contain 120 members if there is not an overhang, and will serve from after the next general election until another election is called. Under section 17 of the Constitution Act 1986, Parliament expires three years "from the day fixed for the return of the writs issued for the last preceding general election of members of the House of Representatives, and no longer".

See also 

 Opinion polling for the 2023 New Zealand general election
 Politics of New Zealand

References 

New Zealand parliaments
Lists of political office-holders in New Zealand
2023 elections in New Zealand